Monodora minor is a species of plant in the family Annonaceae.  It is native to Mozambique and Tanzania. Heinrich Gustav Adolf Engler and Ludwig Diels, the German botanists who first formally described the species, do not explicitly explain the specific epithet but it is among the smaller ( in Latin) members of the genus which includes species that reach heights of 30-40 meters.

Description
It is a bush or small tree reaching 6 meters in height.  Its branches have lenticels.  Its papery leaves are 6-18 by 3.3-8 centimeters and rounded at their tips.  The leaves are smooth on their upper and lower surfaces.  Its petioles are 4-8 millimeters long.  Its pendulous flowers are arranged in cymes which are extra-axillary.  Each flower is on a pedicel 2-5 centimeters long.  Its flowers have 3 oval-shaped sepals that are 7-8 by 4-6 millimeters.  Its 6 petals are arranged in two rows of 3.  The outer petals are yellow with red highlights, 1.9-2 by 1.1-1.5 centimeters, and have wavy margins.  The inner petals are similarly colored with margins that touch one another before they mature.  The inner petals have a 3-6 millimeter wide claw at their base and a 1-1.2 by 0.9-1.1 blade.  The inner petals are smooth on their outer surface, hairy inside, and densely hairy on their margins.  Itsstamens that are 0.5-0.75 millimeters long.  Its fruit are 4.2 by 2.5 centimeters and pale green with yellow spots when developing and dark purple when dry.  Its shiny, light brown seeds are 1.4 by 1.1 by 0.65 centimeters, and triangular in cross-section.

Reproductive biology
The pollen of M. minor is shed as permanent tetrads.

Habitat and distribution
It has been observed growing in coastal regions in wet forests at elevations from 100 to 780 meters.

References

minor
Flora of Mozambique
Flora of Tanzania
Plants described in 1901
Taxa named by Adolf Engler
Taxa named by Ludwig Diels